Indrek Sirel (born 16 January 1970) is a general of the Estonian Defence Forces.

Early life
Sirel was born in Tallinn, Estonia.

Career
Sirel graduated from the Moscow Military Academy in June 1991 and joined the Soviet Union Army. One of his early assignments included being a Platoon Leader in the Baical Military District. He joined the Estonian Defence Forces in June 1993 and has gone through several different courses both in Estonia and in the United States before his post as head of the Estonian Army.

Rank timeline

Soviet Army
1991 Lieutenant (лейтенант)

Estonian Army
1993 Leitnant (Lieutenant)
1993 Kapten (Captain)
1998 Major (Major)
2002 Kolonelleitnant (Lieutenant Colonel)
2008 Kolonel (Colonel)
2012 Brigaadikindral (Brigadier General)
2018 Kindralmajor (Major General)

Awards
4th class Order of the Cross of the Eagle
Defence Forces Service Medal
Special Cross Of The Defence Force
The Golden Cross Of The Army Officer
The Golden Cross Of The Defence Forces

References

|-
 

1970 births
Living people
People from Tallinn
Estonian major generals
Soviet Army officers
Recipients of the Military Order of the Cross of the Eagle, Class IV